Ty Marcelo Maurin (born August 16, 1982) is a former American soccer player.

Early life and education
Maurin was born on August 16, 1982, in La Mirada, California, to Marcelo and Susan Maurin. In 1991 he was playing for the Division 5 Boys American Youth Soccer Organization Region 67 youth soccer team, Chino Outlaws. He attended Don Antonio Lugo High School in Chino, California where he played soccer for 4 years, winning all-league honors in 1998 and 2000. He attended UCLA, where he had played at least 60 matches beginning in 2000, starting in most of them. This included coming on as a substitute in the championship game of the 2002 NCAA Division I Men's Soccer Tournament.

Career
On January 16, 2004, Maurin was drafted in the third round of the 2004 MLS SuperDraft (29th overall) by the Dallas Burn, who were rebranded as FC Dallas later in 2004. After a scoring a header against the Colorado Rapids in the last 2005 pre-season match, he made three appearances for the club a year later. He only played 17 minutes in the MLS before retiring.

References

External links
 
 UCLA bio

1982 births
Living people
American soccer players
UCLA Bruins men's soccer players
Orange County Blue Star players
FC Dallas players
Association football midfielders
Soccer players from California
FC Dallas draft picks
USL League Two players
Major League Soccer players